University of Gedo is a public university in the city of Bardera situated in the Gedo region of Somalia.

In the past, the higher education system in Somalia was mostly concentrated in the area near Mogadishu, the nation's capital. Since the outbreak of civil war in 1991, there have been local efforts to re-establish educational institutions across the country.

History and funding
The University of Gedo's first campus was opened on August 29, 2008 in Bardera. The Somali Development Foundation (SDF), headed by Professor Warsame Ali, was the force behind its establishment. Thanks to long-running efforts by Professor Warsame and his team who have organized fund-raising drives in more than 50 cities in five continents, the Gedo region is among a half dozen regions in Somalia which have established post-secondary learning spaces for their citizens.

Campuses
The founders envision at least two campuses for the University of Gedo, which will be located in Bardera and Beled Hawo. Another campus will possibly be located in Garbahaarreey, the capital of the Gedo region.

Curriculum
Academic policy is drafted locally. In the meantime, the educational curriculum system will be linked to Coventry University in West Midlands, England in the near future.

The University of Gedo and other institutions of higher learning such as Kismayo University and Bardera Polytechnic are working closely with regional educational funding institutions, educators, parent groups, as well as independent schools with the aim of developing a united and standardized curriculum for primary through secondary schools in the larger Jubba region.

Faculties and programs
First phase programs are:

Diplomas
 Business Administration
 Nursing
 Islamic Studies

Non-credit
 Mathematics
 Languages-Somali, Arabic and English
 Computer studies

Staff
 Prof Ali Malaq Ahmed, Chancellor
 Bashir Omar Isse, Vice-Chancellor Academics
 Mohamud Hassan Elmi, Vice-Chancellor Admin and Finance
 Omar Mohamed Abdi 
 Omar Sanweyne, Dean of Registrar, Examination and Student Affairs
 Arab Sheikh Don, Dean of Faculty of Science

References

External links
 University of Gedo website
 Somali Development Foundation (SDF)
 GU Study Faculties

Educational institutions established in 2008
Universities in Somalia
2008 establishments in Somalia